Zollie Anthony Toth (January 26, 1924 – April 3, 2018) was a former running back who played college football at LSU and played in the National Football League from 1950 to 1954. He was a veteran of World War II, serving in the US Navy. Toth died in April 2018 at the age of 94.

References

1924 births
2018 deaths
People from Pocahontas, Virginia
Military personnel from Virginia
Players of American football from Virginia
American football running backs
LSU Tigers football players
New York Yanks players
Dallas Texans (NFL) players
Baltimore Colts players
Western Conference Pro Bowl players
American military personnel of World War II